The Real L Word is an American reality television series aired on the cable station Showtime, where it premiered on June 20, 2010. The show was created by executive producer Ilene Chaiken and Magical Elves Productions, following the success of the television drama The L Word also created by Chaiken. The Real L Word follows a group of lesbians in their daily lives in Los Angeles, and as of the third season, Brooklyn.

With seasons 1 and 2 being successful, Showtime commissioned a third and final season, which premiered on July 12, 2012.

Cast

Episodes

Season 1 (2010)

Season 2 (2011)

Season 3 (2012)

References

External links
 
 

Lesbian-related television shows
2010s American reality television series
2010 American television series debuts
2012 American television series endings
Showtime (TV network) original programming
English-language television shows
Television shows set in Los Angeles
American LGBT-related reality television series
The L Word
Television series by Magical Elves
2010s LGBT-related reality television series